The Roman Catholic Diocese of Joliette (erected 27 January 1904) is a suffragan in Joliette of the Archdiocese of Montréal.

Gallery

Bishops

Ordinaries
Joseph Alfred Archambault (1904–1913)
Joseph-Guillaume-Laurent Forbes (1913–1928), appointed Archbishop of Ottawa, Ontario 
Joseph Arthur Papineau (1928–1968)
René Audet (1968–1990)
Gilles Lussier (1991–2015)
Raymond Poisson (2015-2018), appointed Coadjutor Bishop of Saint-Jérôme, Québec
Louis Corriveau (2019-)

Auxiliary bishop
 Édouard Jetté (1948-1968)

Other priest of this diocese who became bishop
 Vital Massé, appointed Auxiliary Bishop of Saint-Jérôme, Québec in 1993

External links and references

Bibliography
Diocese of Joliette site (in French)

Joliette
Joliette
Joliette
Joliette